UVL may refer to:

 Ultraviolet light
 Undetectable viral load
 United Van Lines, American moving and relocation company
 Unverified List, United States trade restriction list